Amata lucta is a species of moth of the family Erebidae first described by Hippolyte Lucas in 1901. It is found in Australia.

References 

lucta
Moths described in 1901
Moths of Australia